Graham Walters (born 1 March 1953 in Carmarthen, South Wales) is a Welsh rugby union and professional rugby league footballer who played in the 1970s and 1980s; he is also a member of the Welsh Guards and the British Army.

Rugby Playing Career

International honours
Graham Walters won caps for Wales (RL) while at Hull, and Bridgend Blue Dragons 1980-1984, earning 2 caps + 1 cap (interchange/substitute).

Challenge Cup Final appearances
Graham Walters played right-, i.e. number 3, in Hull FC's 5–10 defeat by Hull Kingston Rovers in the 1980 Challenge Cup Final during the 1979–80 season at Wembley Stadium, London on Saturday 3 May 1980, in front of a crowd of 95,000.

Military career 

At the age of 15, Graham Walters joined the junior Welsh Guards as a boy soldier. He was soon made Lance Corporal and climbed his way up the ranks, eventually making junior Sergeant Major. He took on the role of PTI instructor and speedily achieved the status of Judo black belt, and also became ABA champion boxer of the British Army. With his enormous talent for sport, it was inevitable he started to play rugby for the Welsh Guards and the British Army, previously playing for his home country Wales for the under 15-17s.

Graham Walters joined the 1st Battalion of the Welsh Guards after leaving the position of junior guardsman. Being a marksman of all weapons, he also was assigned as a sniper. Following on from this, he became a Guards Para for 18 months, then joined the SAS regiment; he did 6 tours of Northern Ireland of which three were undercover. During this time, Graham Walters was in active service in Belize and Cyprus.

Note
Before the start of the 1984/85 season, Cardiff City Blue Dragons relocated from Ninian Park in Cardiff, to Coychurch Road Ground in Bridgend, and were renamed Bridgend Blue Dragons.

References

External links
  (archived by web.archive.org) Statistics at swansearfc.co.uk
 Statistics at hullfc.com

Cardiff City Blue Dragons players
Hull F.C. players
Living people
Swansea RFC players
Place of birth missing (living people)
Rugby league centres
Rugby union centres
Wakefield Trinity players
Wales national rugby league team players
Welsh rugby league players
Welsh rugby union players
1953 births